Chamops is an extinct genus of polyglyphanodontian lizard from the Late Cretaceous-Early Eocene of North America. Fossils have been found in the Hell Creek Formation, Judith River Formation and Polecat Bench Formation of Montana, the Milk River Formation of Alberta, Canada and possibly also the Laramie Formation of Colorado. It is known from only one species, C. segnis.
Chamops grew to approximately 0.5 meters (20 inches) long, and 2 kilograms (4 pounds) in weight. Unlike other polyglyphanodonts, Chamops had a more blunt snout. Chamops belonged to the Chamopsiid family of polyglyphanodonian lizards that lived in the Northern Hemisphere during the Late Cretaceous, although there are some possible Chamopsiid genera from South America and the Kem Kem Bone Beds in Morocco. It was originally thought Chamops and kin are related to whiptails, although it is now thought they are more closely related to iguanas.

References

Late Cretaceous lepidosaurs of North America
Maastrichtian life
Hell Creek fauna
Fossil taxa described in 1892
Taxa named by Othniel Charles Marsh
Scincogekkonomorpha